The name Leepi has been used to name two tropical cyclones in the western North Pacific Ocean. The name was submitted by Laos and refers to the Li Phi Falls / Tat Somphamit Waterfalls, considered the most beautiful waterfall at the end of southern part of Lao PDR, at the border with Cambodia.

 Tropical Storm Leepi (2013) (T1304, 04W, Emong) – brushed the Philippines and struck Japan.
 Tropical Storm Leepi (2018) (T1815, 19W) – struck southwestern Japan.

References 

Pacific typhoon set index articles